Khargapur Assembly constituency is one of the 230 Vidhan Sabha (Legislative Assembly) constituencies of Madhya Pradesh state in central India. This constituency came into existence in 1967, following the delimitation of the Legislative Assembly constituencies and it was reserved for the candidates belonging to the scheduled castes from 1967 to 2008.

Overview
Khargapur (constituency number 47) is one of the 5 Vidhan Sabha constituencies located in Tikamgarh district. This constituency covers the entire Baldeogarh tehsil, Palera nagar panchayat and part of Palera tehsil of the district.

Khargapur is part of Tikamgarh Lok Sabha constituency along with seven other Vidhan Sabha segments, namely, Jatara, Prithvipur, Niwari and Tikamgarh in this district and Maharajpur, Chhatarpur and Bijawar in Chhatarpur district.

Members of Legislative Assembly

Election results

2013 results

See also
 Palera

References

Tikamgarh district
Assembly constituencies of Madhya Pradesh